SMS Mecklenburg ("His Majesty's Ship Mecklenburg") was the fifth ship of the  of pre-dreadnought battleships of the German Imperial Navy. Laid down in May 1900 at the AG Vulcan shipyard in Stettin, Germany (now Szczecin, Poland), she was finished in May 1903.

Mecklenburg spent the early period of her career in I Squadron of the German fleet, participating in the peacetime routine of training cruises and exercises. After World War I began in August 1914, the ship was mobilized with her sisters as IV Battle Squadron. She saw limited duty in the Baltic Sea against Russian naval forces, and as a guard ship in the North Sea. The German High Command withdrew the ship from active service in January 1916 due to a threat from submarines and naval mines, together with severe shortages in personnel. For the remainder of her career, Mecklenburg served as a prison ship and as a barracks ship based in Kiel. She was stricken from the navy list in January 1920 and sold for scrapping the following year.

Description 

After the German Kaiserliche Marine (Imperial Navy) ordered the four s in 1889, a combination of budgetary constraints, opposition in the Reichstag (Imperial Diet), and a lack of a coherent fleet plan delayed the acquisition of further battleships. The Secretary of the Reichsmarineamt (Imperial Navy Office), Vizeadmiral (Vice Admiral) Friedrich von Hollmann struggled throughout the early- and mid-1890s to secure parliamentary approval for the first three s, but in June 1897, Hollmann was replaced by Konteradmiral (Rear Admiral) Alfred von Tirpitz, who quickly proposed and secured approval for the first Naval Law in early 1898. The Wittelsbachs were broadly similar to the Kaiser Friedrichs, carrying the same armament but with a more comprehensive armor layout.

The ship was powered by three 3-cylinder vertical triple-expansion engines that drove three screws. Steam was provided by six coal-fired Thornycroft boilers and six coal-fired cylindrical boilers. She had a crew of 30 officers and 650 enlisted men.

The ship's primary armament consisted of a main battery of four 24 cm (9.4 in) SK L/40 guns in twin gun turrets, one fore and one aft of the central superstructure. Her secondary armament consisted of eighteen 15 cm (5.9 inch) SK L/40 guns and twelve 8.8 cm (3.45 in) SK L/30 quick-firing guns. Her weaponry was rounded out with six  torpedo tubes, all submerged in the hull; one was in the bow, one in the stern, and the other four on the broadside. Mecklenburgs main battery turrets had  of armor plating.

Service history 
Mecklenburgs keel was laid down on 15 May 1900 at AG Vulcan in Stettin, under construction number 248. She was ordered under the contract name "F", as a new unit for the fleet. Mecklenburg, the last ship of her class, was launched on 9 November 1901; the ceremony was attended by Frederick Francis IV, Grand Duke of Mecklenburg-Schwerin. Fitting-out work proceeded faster on Mecklenburg than on her sister , and so the former was commissioned on 25 June 1903, a full year before Schwaben. Mecklenburg cost 22,329,000 marks.

Immediately following her commissioning, Mecklenburg began sea trials, which lasted until mid-December 1903. Mecklenburg had to enter the drydock at Kaiserliche Werft (Imperial Shipyard) at Wilhelmshaven for minor improvements and repairs following her trials; this work lasted until the end of February 1904. After these modifications, Mecklenburg took part in individual and squadron training exercises, and a fleet review for the visiting British King Edward VII in June. The following month, the German fleet went on a cruise to Britain, the Netherlands, and Norway that lasted until August. Mecklenburg then participated in the annual autumn fleet exercises, which took place in late August and September, and a winter training cruise in November and December.

Starting in mid-December 1904, Mecklenburg went into Wilhelmshaven for periodic maintenance, which lasted until the beginning of March 1905. After emerging from drydock, Mecklenburg joined her sister ship  on a cruise through the Skagerrak to Kiel. While steaming through the Great Belt on 3 March, Mecklenburg struck the Hatter Reef off Samsø, Denmark, and became stuck. Another sister ship, and the light cruiser  were sent to assist Wittelsbach in pulling Mecklenburg free of the reef. Mecklenburg then steamed under her own power to Kiel, where dockyard workers discovered a large dent in her bottom. Repair work was completed at the Kaiserliche Werft in Wilhelmshaven by 20 April, allowing her to participate in the normal routine of training cruises and maneuvers with the fleet for the remainder of the year. During this period, the British Channel Fleet visited the German fleet while it was moored in Swinemünde. From mid-February to the end of March 1906, Mecklenburg was in the Kaiserliche Werft in Wilhelmshaven for her annual overhaul. The training routine continued without incident through 1907 but, in early April 1908, a major accident in one of Mecklenburgs broadside torpedo rooms nearly sank her. Water began to flood the ship and could only be stopped by sealing the torpedo tubes from the outside; repairs lasted until May.

Mecklenburg participated in a training cruise to the Azores in July and August 1908. She also won the Kaiser's Schießpreis (Shooting Prize) for the most accurate gunnery in her squadron, along with the battleship . In mid-December, she returned once again to Wilhelmshaven for the yearly overhaul. The years 1909 and 1910 passed uneventfully for Mecklenburg, with the same pattern of training cruises and maneuvers as in previous years. She began her annual overhaul on 2 December 1910 and returned to service on 7 March 1911, though only briefly. On 31 July, Mecklenburg was replaced by the new dreadnought battleship ; Mecklenburg was then decommissioned and assigned to the Reserve Division in the North Sea. On 9 May 1912, she was transferred to the Reserve Division in the Baltic. She returned briefly to active service in 1912 from 9 to 12 May to move her from the North Sea to the Baltic, and again from 14 August to 28 September to participate in the fleet exercises that year. During the maneuvers, she served in III Squadron.

World War I

After the outbreak of World War I in August 1914, Mecklenburg and the rest of her class were mobilized to serve in IV Battle Squadron, under the command of Vice Admiral Ehrhard Schmidt. The squadron was initially allocated to the North Sea, but was temporarily transferred to the Baltic in September. Starting on 3 September, IV Squadron, assisted by the armored cruiser , conducted a sweep into the eastern Baltic in the direction of the Svenska Högarna islands. The operation lasted until 9 September and failed to bring Russian naval units to battle. The squadron participated in a demonstration off Windau the next day. From 5 December to 2 April 1915, Mecklenburg and the rest of the squadron were assigned to guard duty in the North Sea, based in the mouth of the Elbe.

In May 1915, IV Squadron, including Mecklenburg, was transferred to support the German Army in the Baltic Sea area. Mecklenburg and her sisters were then based in Kiel. From 8 to 12 May, she participated in a sweep toward Gotland and Bogskär, to support the assault on Libau. Mecklenburg and the other ships stood off Gotland to intercept any Russian cruisers that might try to intervene in the landings, but this did not occur. On 10 May, after the invasion force had entered Libau, the British submarines  and  spotted IV Squadron, but were too far away to make an attack. After the operation, Mecklenburg and the rest of IV Squadron returned to the Elbe for guard duties, which lasted until 4 July. The next day, Mecklenburg departed for Kiel in preparation for a major operation in the Baltic. She proceeded to Danzig, and on 11 July departed for a sweep to Gotska Sandön; another patrol to western Gotland followed on 21–22 July. Mecklenburg then steamed from Danzig to Libau on 2 August, where she joined another foray toward Gotska Sandön from 7 to 10 August.

Mecklenburg and her sisters were not included in the German fleet that assaulted the Gulf of Riga in August 1915, due to the scarcity of escorts. The increasingly active British submarines forced the Germans to employ more destroyers to protect the capital ships. Mecklenburg took part in two sweeps to Huvudskär on 9–11 and 21–23 September. On 17 December she ran aground in the entrance to the harbor of Libau, but was towed free without suffering any damage. She was to replace the worn-out armored cruiser  in the reconnaissance forces of the fleet in the Baltic, but Mecklenburg and her sisters were removed from service shortly thereafter. By this stage of the war, the German Navy was facing severe shortages of crews, which could be alleviated by the decommissioning of older, less effective warships. Furthermore, the increasing threat from British submarines and Russian mines in the Baltic by 1916, the latter of which sank the armored cruiser , convinced the German navy to withdraw the elderly Wittelsbach-class ships from active service. On 6 January 1916, Mecklenburg left Libau bound for Kiel, arriving the following day. She was decommissioned on 24 January and placed in reserve.

Mecklenburg was initially based in Kiel and used as a floating prison. In early 1918, she became a barracks ship for the crews of U-boats being repaired in Kiel. Accordingly, on 25 January 1920, Mecklenburg was stricken from the naval register. She was sold to Deutsche Werke, a shipbuilder based in Kiel, on 16 August 1921 for 1,750,000 Marks, and was broken up for scrap metal that year at Kiel-Nordmole.

Footnotes

Notes

Citations

References

Further reading
 

Wittelsbach-class battleships
Ships built in Stettin
1901 ships
World War I battleships of Germany